Komsomolsky is a rural locality (a settlement) and the administrative center of Komsomolskoye Rural Settlement, Kungursky District, Perm Krai, Russia. The population was 3,096 as of 2010. There are 26 streets.

Geography 
Komsomolsky is located 17 km northeast of Kungur (the district's administrative centre) by road. Michkovo is the nearest rural locality.

References 

Rural localities in Perm Krai